The Marriage Market (Leányvásár) is an operetta by Hungarian composer Victor Jacobi. It was premiered on 14 November 1911 at the Király Színház (King Theater) in Budapest and was the composer's first significant success not only in Hungary, but also abroad.  The libretto was by Miklós Bródy and Ferenc Martos.

Adaptations
The operetta enjoyed English-language productions in 1913, in an adaptation by Gladys Unger, with lyrics by Arthur Anderson and Adrian Ross.  It played at Daly's Theatre in London, starring Gertie Millar, produced by George Edwardes, and at the Knickerbocker Theatre on Broadway, produced by Charles Frohman, with additional songs by Jerome Kern.

In 1916 a Spanish-language version was produced, in an adaptation by Emilio González del Castillo, at the Teatro de la Zarzuela in Madrid, under the title Jack. Jacobi's music was adapted by Pablo Luna.

Roles
Kitty Kent — Gertie Millar
Jack Fleetwood, known as "Slippery Jack" — Robert Michaelis
Senator Abe K. Gilroy — E. A. Douglas
Bald-Faced Sandy, Sheriff of Mendocino bluff and proprietor of the Palace Hotel — Tom Walls
Other guests on the yacht: 
Dolly
Pansy
Peach
Dora
Dolores — Kate Welch
Spanish and American cowboys
Mexican Bill — Pop Cory
Shorty
Tabasco Ned — Edward Arundell
Cheyenne Harry
Hi-Ti, a Chinese bar-keeper
Padre Pedro, a Spanish Priest
Captain on the 'Mariposa' 
Midshipmen — Daisy Burrell, Elsie Craven 
Spanish and American girls
Miners
Sailors 
Footmen

Musical numbers (English adaptation)
Act I 
Little Chiquita – Pablo and Chorus 
Compliments – Mariposa, Kitty and Jack 
Never Count Your Chickens Before They're Hatched – Emma and Blinker 
American Courtship – Kitty 
The One I Love – Mariposa and Jack 
Come On Boys For This Is Market Day – Chorus 
Hand In Hand – Mariposa, Jack, Kitty and Hurlingham 

Act II 
All the Ladies Love a Sailor Man – Captain 
Love Of Mine – Mariposa and Jack 
The Middy – Kitty 
A 1 – Blinker 
On Their Honeymoon – Company 
June Is In the Air – Mariposa and Jack 
Answers – Kitty 
How Things Happen – Hurlingham and Blinker 

Act III 
It's Late Now – Blinker 
Jilolo – Kitty 

Additional Numbers 
I'm Not A Silly Billy – Kitty 
The Boy In Blue – Captain 
I Don't Believe In Fairies Now – Blinker 
The Heart of a Sailor – Captain and chorus 
Very Little Time For Loving Nowadays – Blinker and chorus 
Joy Bells – Blinker and chorus

References
Information from MusicalTheatreguide.com
Information from the Guide to Musical Theatre website

External links
Information from the IBDB database about the New York production

Hungarian-language operettas
1911 operas
Operas
Operas by Victor Jacobi